Sappho Painter was an Attic black-figure vase painter, active .

His name vase is a kalpis depicting the poet Sappho, currently held by the National Museum, Warsaw (Inv. 142333). The hand of the Sappho Painter has been identified on 95 vessels, 70% of which are lekythoi. His work has been also seen on tomb wall slabs and epinetra. 

Nearly half of his paintings are of the white-ground style. He apparently avoided the then-predominant red-figure technique, but sometimes used Six's technique whereby figures are laid on a black surface in white or red and details are incised so that the black shows through.  He was influenced and possibly trained by the Edinburgh Painter, and shared a workshop with the Diosophos Painter.

References

External links

The Sappho Painter's name vase at The Beazley Archive, University of Oxford 

Ancient Greek vase painters
6th-century BC Greek people
5th-century BC Greek people